The Fellowship of Christian Testimonies to the Jews (FCTJ) was formed in the 1950s by Fred Kendal, founder of a Jewish mission called Israel's Remnant and Emil Elbe as a Christian mission to Jews. In 1975 the body condemned the Messianic Judaism movement.

References

Conversion of Jews to Christianity
Christian missions